K. K. Kochu is an Indian Dalit thinker, writer and social activist. He was awarded the 2020 Kerala Sahitya Akademi Award for Overall Contributions.

Biography 
He was born on February 2, 1949, at Kallara in Kottayam District. His autobiography 'Dalitan' is his most notable work. His other works include Budhanilekkulla Dhooram, Deshiyathakkoru Charithrapadam, Keralacharithravum Samooharoopeekaranavum, Idathupakshammillatha Kalam, Dalit Padam, Kalapavum Samskaravum.

References 

1949 births
Living people
Dalit writers
Recipients of the Kerala Sahitya Akademi Award
People from Kottayam district